Hațegan is a Romanian surname. Notable people with the surname include:

Nadia Hațegan (born 1979), Romanian gymnast
Ovidiu Hațegan (born 1980), Romanian football referee
Roberto Hațegan (born 2001), Romanian-American footballer

Romanian-language surnames